Gippsland is a primary sub-provincial division of the Australian state of Victoria.

Gippsland, or variation, may also refer to:

Places
 Division of Gippsland, an Australian federal electoral division in the state of Victoria
 Gippsland Province, an Australian provincial electoral district for the state of Victoria
 Electoral district of Gippsland, an Australian provincial electoral district for the state of Victoria
 Electoral district of Gipps' Land, an Australian provincial electoral district for the state of Victoria
 Anglican Diocese of Gippsland, Victoria, Australia

Other uses
 Gippsland languages, a language family spoken in Gippsland, Victoria, Australia
 Gippsland Aeronautics, an Australian aircraft manufacturer
 Gippsland Grammar School, Sale, Victoria, Australia
 Gippsland railway line, a rail line between Melbourne, Latrobe Valley, and Gippsland, Victoria, Australia
 Gippsland V/Line rail service, a rail service between Gippsland and Melbourne, Victoria, Australia

See also

 
 
 Gippsland Times, Sale, Victoria, Australia; a newspaper
 East Gippsland (disambiguation)
 North Gippsland (disambiguation)
 South Gippsland (disambiguation)
 West Gippsland (disambiguation)
 Land (disambiguation)
 Gipps (disambiguation)
 Gipp, a surname